The Drug crisis in Scotland (also known as the Drug deaths crisis or drug epidemic) is a ongoing crisis regarding mortality rates over drug related/misuse deaths in the country. Drug related deaths started to rise during the 1980's, from 2015 onwards the mortality rate of drug misuse deaths in Scotland has increased rapidly, prompting calls of a 'national emergency' within the country over the crisis.

Background 
Drug related (or misuse) mortality rates have began to rise in Scotland since the 1980's. A variety of factors can be considered to be behind the beginning of the epidemic; Neo-liberal economic restructuring in the 1980's caused parts of large cities in Scotland to go into terminal decline causing income inequality to rise and increased inner city deprivation with the working class population particularly affected. An additional factor of heroin markets from Afghanistan and Iran becoming more easy to access and smuggle into Europe in the 1980's made the drug more accessible and affordable then ever. In the early 90's, those born in the late 70's, termed as the 'Trainspotting generation', began to enter the labour market. High unemployment and especially in deprived areas is generally seen as the hypophysis of increased drug use within this generation, having been exposed to the phenomenon during the 1980's.   

Since 2015, mortality rates have dramatically increased, doubling from their previous numbers a decade ago. A factor of this can traced to the more recent ageing of the so called 'Trainspotting generation' (those who grew up in the 1980's and 1990's) which has given rise to increased mortality rates. Funding cuts in 2016 by the Scottish Government reduced drug and alcohol prevention services funding by 20%, however by 2019 this had been restored. Additional reasons may be related to the failings of the UK's drug policy due to drug policy not being a devolved policy issue within Scotland.

Mortality rates 
Scottish mortality rates to drug misuse and related deaths are the highest in Europe, and higher then the United States. This rate is 3.5 times higher than England and Wales.

Council areas 
City council areas have a higher mortality rate then predominately rural areas. This is especially poignant in Dundee and Glasgow which have the worst drug-misuse mortality rate in the country (two times higher then the national average). In the City of Edinburgh, Drug related deaths have tripled from the 2000-2004 period to 2016-2020.

Types of drugs 
Traditionally, Opioids have been the main drug and consist of the majority of drug-related deaths in Scotland when a drug can be implicated. However since 2015, Benzodiazepines, more prominently street Benzodiazepines, cocaine and gabapentin have risen dramatically in implicated drugs. Street Benzodiazepines account for 72% of drug related deaths, in certain areas of Scotland this figure changes. For example in the City of Dundee this rises to 82% of deaths implicated.

Gender divide 
Men have double the mortality rate to drug misuse then women. Approximately 72% of victims to drug misuse were male in 2019 to 28% females.

Age divide 
35 year olds to 54 year olds (this consists of two defined age groups) have the highest mortality rate compared to older and younger generations, this accounts for two-thirds of drug-misuse/related deaths. This feature is different to the United States in which opioid overdoses are from younger users.

Socio-economic element 
People who live in the most deprived areas have a 18 times higher mortality rate then those living in the least deprived areas of Scotland. One in five in Scotland live below the poverty threshold, exacerbating the crisis.

Policy proposals 
Policy proposals to tackle the crisis have been suggested;

 Drug consumption rooms (DCR): Scottish Government ministers have advocated and began to pilot for rooms in which long-term addicts would be able to access clean needles to do drugs, which would potentially stop the spread of HIV from used and shared needles. This policy proposal has been opposed by the UK government and Scottish Conservatives who believe it would create an attitude of acceptance around drug use and criminal activity.

Treatment 
40% of drug users in Scotland are currently in treatment. This figures differs from England where it is around 60%.

References 

Drug-related deaths
Drug policy of the United Kingdom
Drugs in Scotland